Oryctolagus is a genus of lagomorph that today contains the European rabbit and its descendant, the domestic rabbit, as well as several fossil species.

Evolution 
Oryctolagus first appeared at the end of the Miocene, around 6.5 MYA. Fossil remains from the middle Pliocene led to the recognition of two species, Oryctolagus lacosti in southern France and northwestern Italy and Oryctolagus laynensis in the Iberian Peninsula. This latter form is thought to be the origin of the extant species.

Species 
Oryctolagus cuniculus - European rabbit
Oryctolagus cuniculus domesticus - Domestic rabbit

†Oryctolagus lacosti
†Oryctolagus laynensis

References 

Mammal genera
Mammal genera with one living species
Taxa named by Wilhelm Lilljeborg
Leporidae